There are 38 subspecies of Canis lupus listed in the taxonomic authority Mammal Species of the World (2005, 3rd edition). These subspecies were named over the past 250 years, and since their naming, a number of them have gone extinct. The nominate subspecies is the Eurasian wolf (Canis lupus lupus).

Taxonomy
In 1758, the Swedish botanist and zoologist Carl Linnaeus published in his Systema Naturae the binomial nomenclature – or the two-word naming – of species. Canis is the Latin word meaning "dog", and under this genus he listed the dog-like carnivores including domestic dogs, wolves, and jackals. He classified the domestic dog as Canis familiaris, and on the next page he classified the wolf as Canis lupus. Linnaeus considered the dog to be a separate species from the wolf because of its head and body and tail
cauda recurvata - its upturning tail - which is not found in any other canid.

In 1999, a study of mitochondrial DNA indicated that the domestic dog may have originated from multiple wolf populations, with the dingo and New Guinea singing dog "breeds" having developed at a time when human populations were more isolated from each other. In the third edition of Mammal Species of the World published in 2005, the mammalogist W. Christopher Wozencraft listed under the wolf Canis lupus some 36 wild subspecies, and proposed two additional subspecies: familiaris Linnaeus, 1758 and dingo Meyer, 1793. Wozencraft included hallstromi – the New Guinea singing dog – as a taxonomic synonym for the dingo. Wozencraft referred to the mDNA study as one of the guides in forming his decision, and listed the 38 subspecies under the biological common name of "wolf", with the nominate subspecies being the Eurasian wolf (Canis lupus lupus) based on the type specimen that Linnaeus studied in Sweden. However, the classification of several of these canines as either species or subspecies has recently been challenged.

List of extant subspecies
Living subspecies recognized by MSW3  and divided into Old World and New World:

Eurasia and Australasia
Sokolov and Rossolimo (1985) recognised nine Old World subspecies of wolf. These were C. l. lupus, C. l. albus, C. l. pallipes, C. l. cubanensis, C. l. campestris, C. l. chanco, C. l. desortorum, C. l. hattai, and C. l. hodophilax. In his 1995 statistical analysis of skull morphometrics, mammalogist Robert Nowak recognized the first four of those subspecies, synonymized campestris, chanco and desortorum with C. l. lupus, but did not examine the two Japanese subspecies. In addition, he recognized C. l. communis as a subspecies distinct from C. l. lupus. In 2003, Nowak also recognized the distinctiveness of C. l. , C. l. hattai, C. l. italicus, and C. l. hodophilax. In 2005, MSW3 included C. l. filchneri. In 2003, two forms were distinguished in southern China and Inner Mongolia as being separate from C. l. chanco and C. l. filchneri and have yet to be named.

North America

For North America, in 1944 the zoologist Edward Goldman recognized as many as 23 subspecies based on morphology. In 1959, E. Raymond Hall proposed that there had been 24 subspecies of lupus in North America. In 1970, L. David Mech proposed that there was "probably far too many subspecific designations...in use", as most did not exhibit enough points of differentiation to be classified as separate subspecies. The 24 subspecies were accepted by many authorities in 1981 and these were based on morphological or geographical differences, or a unique history. In 1995, the American mammologist Robert M. Nowak analyzed data on the skull morphology of wolf specimens from around the world. For North America, he proposed that there were only five subspecies of the wolf. These include a large-toothed Arctic wolf named C. l. arctos, a large wolf from Alaska and western Canada named C. l. occidentalis, a small wolf from southeastern Canada named C. l. lycaon, a small wolf from the southwestern U.S. named C. l. baileyi and a moderate-sized wolf that was originally found from Texas to Hudson Bay and from Oregon to Newfoundland named C. l. nubilus.

The taxonomic classification of Canis lupus in Mammal Species of the World (3rd edition, 2005) listed 27 subspecies of North American wolf, corresponding to the 24 Canis lupus subspecies and the three Canis rufus subspecies of Hall (1981). The table below shows the extant subspecies, with the extinct ones listed in the following section.

List of extinct subspecies

Subspecies recognized by MSW3  which have gone extinct over the past 150 years: 

Subspecies discovered since the publishing of MSW3 in 2005 which have gone extinct over the past 150 years:

Disputed subspecies

Global
In 2019, a workshop hosted by the IUCN/SSC Canid Specialist Group considered the New Guinea singing dog and the dingo to be feral dogs (Canis familiaris). In 2020, a literature review of canid domestication stated that modern dogs were not descended from the same Canis lineage as modern wolves, and proposed that dogs may be descended from a Pleistocene wolf closer in size to a village dog. In 2021, the American Society of Mammalogists also considered dingos a feral dog (Canis familiaris) population.

Eurasia

Italian wolf

The Italian wolf (or Apennine wolf) was first recognised as a distinct subspecies (Canis lupus italicus) in 1921 by zoologist Giuseppe Altobello.  Altobello's classification was later rejected by several authors, including Reginald Innes Pocock, who synonymised C. l. italicus with C. l. lupus. In 2002, the noted paleontologist R.M. Nowak reaffirmed the morphological distinctiveness of the Italian wolf and recommended the recognition of Canis lupus italicus. A number of DNA studies have found the Italian wolf to be genetically distinct. In 2004, the genetic distinction of the Italian wolf subspecies was supported by analysis which consistently assigned all the wolf genotypes of a sample in Italy to a single group. This population also showed a unique mitochondrial DNA control-region haplotype, the absence of private alleles and lower heterozygosity at microsatellite loci, as compared to other wolf populations. In 2010, a genetic analysis indicated that a single wolf haplotype (w22) unique to the Apennine Peninsula and one of the two haplotypes (w24, w25), unique to the Iberian Peninsula, belonged to the same haplogroup as the prehistoric wolves of Europe. Another haplotype (w10) was found to be common to the Iberian peninsula and the Balkans. These three populations with geographic isolation exhibited a near lack of gene flow and spatially correspond to three glacial refugia.

The taxonomic reference Mammal Species of the World (3rd edition, 2005) does not recognize Canis lupus italicus; however, NCBI/Genbank publishes research papers under that name.

Iberian wolf

The Iberian wolf was first recognised as a distinct subspecies (Canis lupus signatus) in 1907 by zoologist Ángel Cabrera. The wolves of the Iberian peninsula have morphologically distinct features from other Eurasian wolves and each are considered by their researchers to represent their own subspecies.

The taxonomic reference Mammal Species of the World (3rd edition, 2005) does not recognize Canis lupus signatus; however, NCBI/Genbank does list it.

Himalayan wolf

The Himalayan wolf is distinguished by its mitochondrial DNA, which is basal to all other wolves. The taxonomic name of this wolf is disputed, with the species Canis himalayensis being proposed based on two limited DNA studies. In 2017, a study of mitochondrial DNA, X-chromosome (maternal lineage) markers and Y-chromosome (male lineage) markers found that the Himalayan wolf was genetically basal to the Holarctic grey wolf and has an association with the African golden wolf.

In 2019, a workshop hosted by the IUCN/SSC Canid Specialist Group noted that the Himalayan wolf's distribution included the Himalayan range and the Tibetan Plateau. The group recommends that this wolf lineage be known as the "Himalayan wolf" and classified as Canis lupus chanco until a genetic analysis of the holotypes is available. In 2020, further research on the Himalayan wolf found that it warranted species-level recognition under the Unified Species Concept, the Differential Fitness Species Concept, and the Biological Species Concept. It was identified as an Evolutionary Significant Unit that warranted assignment onto the IUCN Red List for its protection.

Indian plains wolf

The Indian plains wolf is a proposed clade within the Indian wolf (Canis lupus pallipes) that is distinguished by its mitochondrial DNA, which is basal to all other wolves except for the Himalayan wolf. The taxonomic status of this wolf clade is disputed, with the separate species Canis indica being proposed based on two limited DNA studies. The proposal has not been endorsed because they relied on a limited number of museum and zoo samples that may not have been representative of the wild population and a call for further fieldwork has been made.

The taxonomic reference Mammal Species of the World (3rd edition, 2005) does not recognize Canis indica; however, NCBI/Genbank lists it as a new subspecies, Canis lupus indica.

Southern Chinese wolf
In 2017, a comprehensive study found that the gray wolf was present across all of mainland China, both in the past and today. It exists in southern China, which refutes claims made by some researchers in the Western world that the wolf had never existed in southern China. This wolf has not been taxonomically classified.

In 2019, a genomic study on the wolves of China included museum specimens of wolves from southern China that were collected between 1963 and 1988. The wolves in the study formed three clades: northern Asian wolves that included those from northern China and eastern Russia, Himalayan wolves from the Tibetan Plateau, and a unique population from southern China. One specimen from Zhejiang Province in eastern China shared gene flow with the wolves from southern China; however, its genome was 12-14 percent admixed with a canid that may be the dhole or an unknown canid that predates the genetic divergence of the dhole. The wolf population from southern China is believed to be still existing in that region.

North America

Coastal wolves
A study of the three coastal wolves indicates a close phylogenetic relationship across regions that are geographically and ecologically contiguous, and the study proposed that Canis lupus ligoni (the Alexander Archipelago wolf), Canis lupus columbianus (the British Columbian wolf), and Canis lupus crassodon (the Vancouver Coastal Sea wolf) should be recognized as a single subspecies of Canis lupus. They share the same habitat and prey species, and form one study's six identified North American ecotypes - a genetically and ecologically distinct population separated from other populations by their different type of habitat.

Eastern wolf

The eastern wolf has two proposals over its origin. One is that the eastern wolf is a distinct species (C. lycaon) that evolved in North America, as opposed to the gray wolf that evolved in the Old World, and is related to the red wolf. The other is that it is derived from admixture between gray wolves which inhabited the Great Lakes area and coyotes, forming a hybrid that was classified as a distinct species by mistake.

The taxonomic reference Mammal Species of the World (3rd edition, 2005) does not recognize Canis lycaon, however NCBI/Genbank does list it. In 2021, the American Society of Mammalogists also considered Canis lycaon a valid species.

Red wolf

The red wolf is an enigmatic taxon, of which there are two proposals over its origin. One is that the red wolf was a distinct species (C. rufus) that has undergone human-influenced admixture with coyotes. The other is that it was never a distinct species but was derived from past admixture between coyotes and gray wolves, due to the gray wolf population being eliminated by humans.

The taxonomic reference Mammal Species of the World (3rd edition, 2005) does not recognize Canis rufus, however NCBI/Genbank does list it. In 2021, the American Society of Mammalogists also considered Canis rufus a valid species.

See also
 List of gray wolf populations by country
 Wolf distribution
 Cave wolf
 Pleistocene wolf

Notes

References

External links 
 Canis lupus on the ITIS (Integrated Taxonomic Information System)

 
Canis lupus